Henrik Blomqvist is a Swedish professional ice hockey defenceman who currently plays for Pelicans of the SM-liiga.

References

External links

Lahti Pelicans players
Swedish expatriates in Finland
Living people
1984 births
Swedish ice hockey defencemen
People from Växjö
Sportspeople from Kronoberg County